Mary Martha Berthune, Lady Abbott (October 17, 1823 – February 25, 1898) was the wife of Sir John Abbott, the third Prime Minister of Canada.

Family
Bethune was the daughter of Anglican clergyman and McGill acting president John Bethune. She and John Abbott married on July 26, 1849 and had four sons and four daughters. Mary and John Abbott are maternal great-grandparents of actor Christopher Plummer.

See also
 Spouse of the prime minister of Canada

References

1823 births
1898 deaths
Spouses of prime ministers of Canada